Renata Končić (born 17 September 1977), known professionally by her stage name Minea, is a Croatian pop singer and television presenter.

Early life
Končić was born in Zagreb, where her career is based. She recorded 7 albums from 1995 to 2003 which amassed her commercial acclaim in Croatia. In more recent years she began a career as a television host and personality, appearing in the first season of Tvoje lice zvuči poznato, and hosting the IN magazin show alongside media personality Dalibor Petko.

Discography

Albums
 Vrapci i komarci (1995)
 E, pa neka (1997)
 Mimo zakona (2000)
 Kad smo... ono, znaš (2001)
 Sve u četiri oka (2004)
 Good boy (1995)
 Sve najbolje (2003)

Compilations
 Sve najbolje (2003)

References

General
 Minea at Croatia Records

External links
Official website (homepage archive)

1977 births
Living people
Musicians from Zagreb
20th-century Croatian women singers
Croatian pop singers
Croatian folk-pop singers
21st-century Croatian women singers